1977 Uganda Cup was the third season of the main Ugandan football Cup.

Overview
The competition has also been known as the Kakungulu Cup and was won by Simba FC who were awarded a walkover after Nytil FC failed to appear for the final. At a time of the Idi Amin regime, the Army side, Simba FC, were eager to represent the country and forced the organisers to change the date of the final. Nytil learnt of the change via a radio-announcement and hence failed to show up. The results are not available for the earlier rounds

Final

Footnotes

External links
 Uganda - List of Cup Finals - RSSSF (Mikael Jönsson, Ian King and Hans Schöggl)

Ugandan Cup
Uganda Cup
Cup